Baltimore Public Library can refer to:

Enoch Pratt Free Library, the public library system of the city of Baltimore, Maryland
Baltimore County Public Library, the public library system of Baltimore County, Maryland